The 2019–20 West Virginia Mountaineers men's basketball team represented West Virginia University during the 2019–20 NCAA Division I men's basketball season. The Mountaineers were coached by Bob Huggins, in his 13th season as WVU's head coach, and played their home games at the WVU Coliseum in Morgantown, West Virginia as members of the Big 12 Conference. Preseason Big 12 polls picked the Mountaineers to finish 5th in the conference standings and Oscar Tshiebwe was picked as Big 12 Preseason Freshman of the Year. The Mountaineers season officially started on November 8, 2019.

Previous season
The Mountaineers finished the 2018–19 season 15–21, 4–14 in Big 12 play to finish in last place in the conference. They defeated Oklahoma and Texas Tech to advance to the semifinal game of the Big 12 tournament where they lost to Kansas. They received an invitation to the 2019 College Basketball Invitational where they defeated Grand Canyon and advanced to the second round where they were defeated by Coastal Carolina.

Offseason

Departures

Recruits

Recruiting class of 2019

Incoming transfers

Roster

Schedule and results
Source

|-
!colspan=9 style=| Exhibition

|-
!colspan=9 style=| Regular season

|-
!colspan=9 style=|Big 12 tournament
|- style="background:#bbbbbb"
| style="text-align:center"|Mar 12, 20208:00 pm, ESPN2
| style="text-align:center"| (6)  No. 22
| vs. (3) OklahomaQuarterfinals
| colspan=5 rowspan=1 style="text-align:center"|Cancelled due to the COVID-19 pandemic
| style="text-align:center"|Sprint CenterKansas City, MO

Rankings

*AP does not release post-NCAA Tournament rankings.

References

West Virginia Mountaineers men's basketball seasons
West Virginia
West Virginia
West Virginia